Marvin Cupper (born February 16, 1994) is a German professional ice hockey goaltender. He is currently an unrestricted free agent who most recently played with Schwenninger Wild Wings of the Deutsche Eishockey Liga (DEL).

Playing career
During the 2014–15 season while playing with the Shawinigan Cataractes of the Quebec Major Junior Hockey League, Cupper was named to the QMJHL First All-Star Team.

Undrafted after three seasons as the starting goaltender of the Cataractes, Cupper returned to his native Germany to launch his professional career in signing a three-year contract with Eisbären Berlin of the DEL on July 16, 2015.

Cupper remained within the Eisbären Berlin organization for five seasons before leaving as a free agent to sign a one-year deal with Krefeld Pinguine on 18 April 2020.

Awards and honours

References

External links

1994 births
Living people
Dresdner Eislöwen players
Eisbären Berlin players
German ice hockey goaltenders
Krefeld Pinguine players
Lausitzer Füchse players
Schwenninger Wild Wings players
Shawinigan Cataractes players
Sportspeople from Cologne